Totally Hits was a series of various artists compilation albums released in collaboration with BMG and Warner Music Group, intending to showcase some of the most popular hit songs of the time. The series was intended to rival EMI and UMG's Now That's What I Call Music! series.

For the first volume, a massive ad campaign was launched, with both record labels putting out TV spots, Internet ads, and promotions for the release. Label executives referred to it as "the definitive collection of 1998 and 1999 hit singles," and "the first multi-format collection to boast virtually an entire program of bonafide crossover smashes." The first volume debuted and peaked at #14 on the Billboard Top 200 and received favorable reviews from Robert Christgau and Entertainment Weekly, who preferred it to Now! 3.

The first release was distributed by BMG's Arista Records. Prior to Totally Hits, Arista had been releasing various artists compilations known as the Ultimate series for the past four years. Arista executive vice president Charles Goldstuck claimed he wanted to "expand the franchise. We thought we'd be better off with a partner, so we could source the right repertoire and end up with as strong a compilation as possible to give the consumer complete value." Warner CEO Roger Ames accepted, and a track listing was put together in only a couple of months.

Titles
 Totally Hits (released November 9, 1999), first main series
 Totally Hits, Vol. 2 (May 30, 2000), second main series
 Totally Hits, Vol. 3 (November 14, 2000), third main series
 Totally Dance (June 26, 2001)
 Totally Hits 2001 (September 25, 2001), fourth main series
 Totally Country (February 5, 2002), first Totally Country series
 Totally Hits 2002 (June 4, 2002), fifth main series
 Totally Hits 2002: More Platinum Hits (October 29, 2002), sixth main series
 Totally Country Vol. 2 (October 29, 2002), second Totally Country series
 Totally R&B (July 1, 2003)
 Totally Hip Hop (July 1, 2003)
 Totally Country Vol. 3 (September 23, 2003), third Totally Country series
 Totally Hits 2003 (October 7, 2003), seventh main series
 Totally Hits 2004 (May 4, 2004), eighth main series
 Totally Hits 2004, Vol. 2 (October 5, 2004), ninth main series
 Totally Country Vol. 4 (February 8, 2005), fourth Totally Country series
 Totally Hits 2005 (May 17, 2005), tenth main series
 Totally Country Vol. 5 (February 7, 2006), fifth Totally Country series
 Only Hits Vol. 1 (November 7, 2006), eleventh main series
 Totally Country Vol. 6 (January 30, 2007), sixth Totally Country series

References

See also
 Now That's What I Call Music! series
 "Hits" (UK equivalent)

 
Atlantic Records compilation albums